Arron Crawford (born 29 September 1983) is an Australian cricketer who played for Western Australia.  He made his debut in October 2008, replacing the injured Ben Edmondson.

References

External links

1983 births
Living people
Australian cricketers
Western Australia cricketers
Cricketers from Perth, Western Australia